privacyIDEA is a two factor authentication system which is multi-tenency- and multi-instance-capable. It is opensource, written in Python and hosted at GitHub. privacyIDEA is a LinOTP's fork from 2014.

Fields of use 
privacyIDEA provides an authentication backend for various kinds of applications (including SSH, VPN, as well as web applications such as ownCloud). Thus it is meant to replace classical proprietary two factor authentication systems such as RSA SecurID or Vasco. It supports single sign-on via SAML. It is also possible to login with a second factor to Windows desktops using a privacyIDEA Credential Provider.

Installation 
privacyIDEA runs on-premises as a web application on a Linux system. It can be set up quickly and easily. It can run on Debian, Ubuntu and RedHat.

Authentication devices 
privacyIDEA supports a wide variety of authentication devices. Amongst those are hardware tokens like Feitian C200, the Yubikey by Yubico or other U2F/WebAuthn devices. Many smartphone apps compliant with HOTP and TOTP are also supported.

References 

Computer security software
Authentication methods
Computer access control
Linux